Joseph Saddler (born January 1, 1958), popularly known by his stage name Grandmaster Flash, is an American DJ and rapper. He is considered to be one of the pioneers of hip hop DJing, cutting, scratching, and mixing. Grandmaster Flash and the Furious Five were inducted into the Rock and Roll Hall of Fame in 2007, becoming the first hip hop act to be honored. In 2019 he won the Polar Music Prize. On May 21, 2022, he acquired an honorary doctorate in Fine Arts from Buffalo State College.

Early life, family and education
Saddler's family immigrated to the United States from Barbados. He was raised in the Bronx, New York City, where he attended Samuel Gompers High School, a public vocational school. There, he learned how to repair electronic equipment. Saddler's parents played an important role in his interest in music. His father was a fan of Caribbean and African American recordings.

During his childhood, Joseph Saddler was fascinated by his father's record collection. In an interview, he reflected: "My father was a very heavy record collector.... I used to open his closets and just watch all the records he had. I used to get into trouble for touching his records, but I'd go right back and bother them." Saddler's early interest in DJing came from this fascination with his father's record collection as well as his mother's desire for him to educate himself in electronics. After high school, he became involved in the earliest New York DJ scene, attending parties set up by early luminaries like DJ Kool Herc and Disco King Mario.

Saddler's uncle Sandy Saddler was a featherweight boxing champion.

Innovations 

Grandmaster Flash carefully studied the styles and techniques of earlier DJs, particularly Pete Jones, Kool Herc, and Grandmaster Flowers. As a teenager, he began experimenting with DJ gear in his bedroom, eventually developing and mastering three innovations that are still considered standard DJing techniques today.

 Backspin technique (or quick-mix theory): Early New York party DJs came to understand that short drum breaks were popular with party audiences. Kool Herc began experimenting with the use of two identical tracks to extend the ‘break’, or instrumental section, resulting in what was known as ‘break-beat’. Grandmaster Flash perfected this technique where he could play the break on one record while searching for the same fragment of music on the other with the aid of his headphones. When the break finished on one turntable, he used his mixer to switch quickly to the other turntable, where the same beat was cued up and ready to play. Using the backspin technique (also referred to as beat juggling), the same short phrase of music could be looped indefinitely. 
 Punch phrasing (or clock theory): This technique involved isolating very short segments of music, typically horn hits, and rhythmically punching them over the sustained beat using the mixer.
 Scratching: Although the invention of record scratching as a form of adding to the musical entertainment is generally credited to Grand Wizzard Theodore, Grandmaster Flash perfected the technique and brought it to new audiences. Scratching, along with punch phrasing, exhibited a unique aspect of party DJing: instead of passively spinning records, he manipulated them to create new music.

Grandmaster Flash and the Furious Five

1970s 
Grandmaster Flash played parties and collaborated with rappers such as Kurtis Blow and Lovebug Starski. In the late 1970s, he formed his own group. The original lineup consisted of Cowboy (Keef Cowboy), Melle Mel (Melvin Glover), and The Kidd Creole (AKA Kidd Creole/Nathaniel Glover), and the ensemble went by the name "Grandmaster Flash & the 3 MCs". Cowboy created the term hip hop. He created the term while teasing a friend who had just joined the U.S. Army, by scat singing the words "hip/hop/hip/hop" in a way that mimicked the rhythmic cadence of soldiers marching. Cowboy later worked the "hip hop" cadence into a part of his stage performance.

Mel was the first rapper to call himself "MC" (Master of Ceremony). Two other rappers briefly joined, but they were replaced more permanently by Rahiem (Guy Todd Williams, previously in the Funky Four) and Scorpio (Eddie Morris, a.k.a. Mr. Ness) to make Grandmaster Flash and the Furious Five. Quickly gaining recognition for their skillful raps, Grandmaster Flash and the Furious Five pioneered MCing and freestyle battles. Some of the staple phrases in MCing have their origins in the early shows and recordings of the group. In 1978, the new group began performing regularly at Disco Fever in the Bronx, one of the first times a hip-hop group was given a weekly gig at a well-known venue.

Grandmaster Flash and the Furious Five were signed to Bobby Robinson's Enjoy Records and in 1979 released their first single, "Superrappin'".

1980s 
In 1980 they signed to Sugar Hill Records and began touring and releasing numerous singles. The seminal "The Adventures of Grandmaster Flash on the Wheels of Steel", released in 1981, is a 7-minute solo showcase of Grandmaster Flash's virtuosic turntable skills, combining elements of Blondie's "Rapture", Michael Viner's Incredible Bongo Band's "Apache", Queen's "Another One Bites the Dust", Chic's "Good Times", and the group's own "Freedom". It is also the first documented appearance of scratching on a record. That year, the group opened for The Clash and were poorly received by an audience unaccustomed to the new style.
The group's most significant hit was the electro rap song "The Message" (1982), which was produced by in-house Sugar Hill producer Clifton "Jiggs" Chase and featured session musician Duke Bootee. Unlike earlier rap tunes, "The Message" featured a grim narrative about inner city violence, drugs, and poverty. In 2002, it was one of 50 recordings chosen by the Library of Congress to be added to the National Recording Registry, the first hip hop recording to receive this honor. Critics praised the song's social awareness, calling the chorus "a slow chant seething with desperation and fury."

Other than Melle Mel, no members of the group actually appear in the song. Rahiem lip-synced Duke Bootee's vocal in the music video. The same year, Grandmaster Flash appeared in the movie "Wild Style" and sued Sugar Hill over the non-payment of royalties. Tensions mounted as "The Message" gained in popularity, eventually leading to a rupture between Melle Mel and Grandmaster Flash. Soon the group disintegrated entirely. Grandmaster Flash, The Kidd Creole, and Rahiem left Sugar Hill, signed with Elektra Records, and continued on as simply "Grandmaster Flash", while Melle Mel and the others continued on as "Grandmaster Melle Mel & the Furious Five".

Grandmaster Flash was also interviewed in the 1986 cult documentary Big Fun in the Big Town.

Although frequently credited on the records, Grandmaster Flash does not actually appear on "The Message", "Freedom", or many of the other Furious Five songs. Although Grandmaster Flash provided the central element of the group's sound when performing live (in addition to giving the group its name), there was little room for his turntablism in early singles driven by the grooves of live session musicians. Grandmaster Flash and The Furious Five reformed in 1987 for a charity concert, and in 1988 they released a new album. The group reunited again in 1994, although Cowboy died in 1989.

1990s 

In 1999, Grandmaster Flash recorded with DJ Tomekk and Flavor Flav the single 1, 2, 3, ... Rhymes Galore. The single stayed for 17 weeks in the TOP ten of the German charts.

2000s 
In 2008 he released a memoir, The Adventures of Grandmaster Flash: My Life, My Beats, in which he talks about the origins of his fascination with scratching records and creating new beats. From a young age, Flash talks about how he would sneak into his father's record room to watch the record player spin, and then get punished for touching the records. He found inspiration even from things not associated with music. The spokes of his bicycle caused an interest in how record players create music just by rotating a grooved disc. Flash continued to experiment by taking apart any machine he could get his hands on to figure out how it worked. His early work shows the innovative ways in which his artistic abilities led to what is considered the first evolution of hip hop culture.

He hosted a weekly show on Sirius Satellite Radio (Friday Night Fire with Grandmaster Flash) and was presented with the BET "I Am Hip Hop Icon" award in 2006.

Grandmaster Flash and the Furious Five were the first hip-hop/rap group inducted into the Rock & Roll Hall of Fame on March 12, 2007 by Jay-Z. In 2008, he remixed the single "Into the Galaxy" by the Australian group, Midnight Juggernauts.

It has been said that "his pioneering mixing skills transformed the turntable into a true 'instrument', and his ability to get a crowd moving has made his DJ sets legendary."

Grandmaster Flash appears in the video game DJ Hero as a playable character along with original mixes created for the game.

In December 2011, Grandmaster Flash was reported to be at work on his 12th album.

Aired in 2016, the Netflix original series The Get Down features a version of Grandmaster Flash that is played by Mamoudou Athie. The series takes place in 1977 New York City and follows the genesis of the DJing, B-boying, and hip-hop cultures of the city. After the premiere of The Get Down, Netflix premiered Hip-Hop Evolution, a music documentary discussing the history of hip hop in which Grandmaster Flash talks about the evolution of his art.

In 2023, Grandmaster Flash competed in season nine of The Masked Singer as "Polar Bear". He was eliminated on "New York Night". As part of his encore, some DJ equipment was brought out so that Grandmaster Flash can scratch along to Chic's "Good Times".

Discography

Albums

Singles 
 1979 – Superappin' (Enjoy 6001) Side A – Superappin'; Side B – Superappin' Theme
 1980 – Freedom (Sugar Hill SH-549) Side A – vocal; Side B – instrumental
 1981 – The Adventures of Grandmaster Flash on the Wheels of Steel (Sugar Hill SH-557)
 1981 – Scorpio (Sugar Hill SH 118) Side A – vocal; Side B – instrumental
 1982 – Flash To The Beat (Sugar Hill SH 574)
 1984 – Jesse (Sugar Hill SH 133) Side A – vocal; Side B – instrumental
 1984 – We Don't Work For Free (Sugar Hill SH 136) Side A – vocal; Side B – instrumental
 1988 – Gold (edit) (Elektra EKR 70)
 1996 – If U Wanna Party (feat. Carl Murray) (JAM 1002-8)

Filmography

Awards 
Grammys
 2012 Hall of Fame for Grandmaster Flash & The Furious Five single “The Message.”
Urban Music Awards
 2009, Lifetime Achievement Award
Rock and Roll Hall of Fame
 2007, Inductee
BET Hip Hop Awards
 2006, I Am Hip Hop Icon Award

Polar Music Prize

 2019, awarded Sweden's Polar Prize

Honorary Doctorates Degree
2022, Buffalo State College

References

Further reading

External links

 
 
 
 
 Grandmaster Flash Interview NAMM Oral History Program (2019)

1958 births
Living people
American hip hop record producers
American hip hop DJs
The Godfathers Of Threatt members
Electro musicians
People from Bridgetown
East Coast hip hop musicians
Rappers from the Bronx
Fury Records artists
Grandmaster Flash and the Furious Five members
Record collectors
21st-century American rappers
Record producers from New York (state)